Mr. Country & Western Music is an album by American country music artist George Jones released in 1965 on the Musicor Records label.

Background
Although Mr. Country and Western Music includes many of the heartache and drinking songs that Jones had become famous for, this collection of new recordings sees the singer moving towards the more refined Nashville Sound that had been spearheaded by Chet Atkins, Owen Bradley, and a handful of other producers who saw the potential of sweetening the backing tracks with strings and female singers as a way to compete with the ever-increasing popularity of rock and roll.  As Bob Allen observes in his book George Jones: The Life and Times of a Honky Tonk Legend, "These men figured - correctly, as it turned out - that they could make those dollar signs even bigger if they could produce country records that captured the imagination of the much larger, urban-dwelling, pop music-orientated record buying public."  In addition to this change in Jones's music, his singing voice had matured and grown noticeably deep since his earliest recordings.  Adds Allen: "He was now in his mid-thirties, and fewer and fewer of his performances in the studio were charged with the youthful, high-whining honky-tonk fervor and raw rockabilly fire that had echoed so clearly through his early hits.  He had come to be more comfortable with the lower and mid-range registers of his voice.  Ever so gradually, he was becoming less ill at ease with the mellower "uptown"-style songs that Pappy (Daily, Jones's producer) was starting to bring around for him to record."  By this point, Jones' singing style had evolved from the full-throated, high lonesome sound of Hank Williams and Roy Acuff on his early Starday records to the more refined, subtle style of Lefty Frizzell. In a 2006 interview with Billboard, Jones acknowledged the fellow Texan's influence on his idiosyncratic phrasing: "I got that from Lefty. He always made five syllables out of one word."

Jones would re-record "Don't You Ever Get Tired (Of Hurting Me) in his 1989 album One Woman Man.

Track listing 
 "I Just Lost My Favorite Girl" (Don Adams)
 "What's Bad for You Is Good for Me" (Melba Montgomery, Carl Montgomery)
 "Don't You Ever Get Tired (Of Hurting Me)" (Hank Cochran)
 "How Proud I Would Have Been" (Joe Poovey)
 "Flowers for Mama" (Eddie Noack, Marvin Rumley, Wayne P. Walker)
 "Gonna Take Me Away from You" (George Jones, Darrell Edwards)
 "I Can't Get Used to Being Lonely" (Earl Montgomery)
 "Let a Little Loving Come In" (Leon Payne)
 "Selfishness in Man" (Leon Payne)
 "Worst of Luck" (Joe Poovey)
 "Even the Bad Times Are Good" (Carl Belew, Clyde Pitts)
 "Sea Between Our Hearts" (Darrell Edwards, Merle Moore)

References

External links
 George Jones' Official Website

1965 albums
George Jones albums
Albums produced by Pappy Daily
Musicor Records albums